Ellefson is a surname. Notable people with the surname include:

 Art Ellefson (born 1932), Canadian saxophonist
 Ben Ellefson (born 1996), American football player
 Christian Ellefson (1842–1925), American politician
 David Ellefson (born 1964), American musician
 Peter Ellefson, American trombonist and academic
 Ray Ellefson (1927–1994), American basketballer

Swedish-language surnames